Spring Hill High School is a public high school located in the city of Longview, Texas, in Gregg County, United States and classified as a 4A school by the UIL. It is a part of the Spring Hill Independent School District located northwest of the city of Longview. In 2013, the school was rated "Met Standard" by the Texas Education Agency.

Athletics
The Spring Hill Panthers compete in these sports:

Baseball
Basketball
Cross Country
Football
Golf
Powerlifting
Soccer
Softball
Tennis
Track and Field
Volleyball

State titles
Boys Track 
1962 (B)

Notable alumni
Brandon Carter, former NFL player

References

External links
Spring Hill ISD website

Public high schools in Texas
Schools in Gregg County, Texas